Alexander Igorevich Dyachenko (born 24 January 1990) is a banned Russian sprint canoeist.

He won the Men's K-2 200 metres gold medal at the 2012 Summer Olympics with Yury Postrigay. At the ICF Canoe Sprint World Championships he has won one gold medal (K-2 200 m: 2013), three silver medals (K-1 x 200 m: 2011, 2013, K-2 200 m: 2015) and two bronze medals (K-1 4 × 200 m: 2010, K-4 200 m: 2009).

Dyachenko began canoeing at the age of 6.

In June 2022, Dyachenko was one of three Russian canoeists who were given doping bans along with Nikolay Lipkin and Aleksandra Dupik. He was given a four year ban starting on 9 June 2022 and all of his results from 5 June 2014 to 31 December 2016 were disqualified. ICF officially stripped the medals that Dyachenko won during this period.

Personal life
Dyachenko is married to honored Master of Sports of Russia, rhythmic gymnastics coach, Anna Shumilova. Their daughter, Inna was born on July 21, 2014.  He himself was awarded the title of Honoured Master of Sport in Russia in 2015.  He was also awarded the Order of Friendship after winning his Olympic gold medal.

References

External links

Canoe09.ca profile

1990 births
Living people
Russian male canoeists
Canoeists at the 2012 Summer Olympics
Olympic canoeists of Russia
Olympic gold medalists for Russia
Olympic medalists in canoeing
ICF Canoe Sprint World Championships medalists in kayak
Medalists at the 2012 Summer Olympics
European Games competitors for Russia
Canoeists at the 2015 European Games
Universiade medalists in canoeing
Universiade gold medalists for Russia
Medalists at the 2013 Summer Universiade